The U.S. state of Alabama first required its residents to register their motor vehicles and display license plates in 1911.

, plates are issued by the Alabama Department of Revenue. Only rear plates have been required on standard passenger vehicles since 1963.

History
Some Alabama municipalities issued their own license plates for horse-drawn vehicles as well as automobiles prior to 1911. The earliest known plate is a bronze plate, "No. 1", issued by the city of Bessemer on a two-horse wagon in 1901, while the earliest known plate for an automobile is a 1906 dash plate issued by the city of Birmingham, originally assigned to a 1904 6-cylinder Ford. Between 1909 and 1911, Birmingham and Mobile issued annual plates made of porcelain-coated steel, while Montgomery, the state capital, issued a similar plate only in 1909. Dothan also issued a porcelain plate in 1911.

The state first issued annual license plates on October 1, 1911, with plate #1 being issued to the Leak Funeral Home in Montgomery. Until 1980, the license year was October 1 to September 30. Porcelain plates were originally used, before the state switched to embossed metal plates in 1915. The 1916–17 plate was the first to feature the year of expiration, while the 1921–22 plate was the first to use a horsepower class system, with each class denoted by a letter. Kilby Prison near Montgomery took charge of all plate manufacture in 1928.

In 1933, the horsepower classes were replaced by weight classes, using the same letter system; these lasted until 1952. County coding was introduced in 1941.

A 1951 law added a heart shape and the phrase "Heart of Dixie" to the state's license plates (beginning with the 1954–55 plate), adopting a slogan created by the Alabama Chamber of Commerce. The heart motif and slogan remain in use on all standard-issue plates today.

The 1955 (dated 1956) issue was the first Alabama license plate that complied with these standards.

Since 1980, Alabama has used a staggered registration system based on the first letter of the registrant's last name. Registrations expire January through November, with fleet, leased, and commercial vehicles expiring in November.

Passenger baseplates

1911 to 1976

1976 to present

Non-passenger and specialty plates 
Alabama offers a variety of optional plates that motorists may display upon the payment of an additional fee as well as non-passenger plate types that are displayed on vehicles for specialized uses.

Non-passenger types 
Many non-passenger types are both county-coded and weight-coded. Where noted, the county code is the first one or two regularly sized number of the serial, while the weight code is a small number beneath the letter that indicates the vehicle type.

Specialty types

County coding 
Alabama established a numerical county-code system for its license plates in 1941, with codes 1, 2 and 3 assigned to the three most populous counties of the time (Jefferson, Mobile and Montgomery), and codes 4 through 67 assigned to the remaining counties in alphabetical order. Code 70 was added in 1948 for replacement plates, followed in 1966 by code 80 for supplemental plates in counties that had run out of standard plates. The system remains in use today on passenger plates and some non-passenger types.

References

External links 
 Alabama Department of Revenue Motor Vehicle Division
 Alabama license plates, 1969–present

Alabama
Transportation in Alabama
Vehicle registration